Hacıqəhrəmanlı (also, Gadzhi-Kakhyrmanly, Gadzhykagramanly, and Gadzhykakhramanly) is a village and municipality in Shirvan, Azerbaijan.  It has a population of 2,600.

References 

Populated places in Azerbaijan
Şirvan, Azerbaijan